CannaCruz is a cannabis dispensary located on Limekiln Street in Santa Cruz, California.

History
In 2004 CannaCruz CEOs Grant and Brad Palmer began making cannabis derived tinctures and topical medications for their father who had recently suffered a stroke and a heart attack. Pleased at how well their father took to the remedies, the brothers began to make products for various dispensaries around the San Francisco Bay Area and by 2008 business was doing well enough for the brothers to open a dispensary on Limekiln Street in Santa Cruz, California. In June 2019 a second location was opened on Abbott Street in Salinas, California

Reception
In 2019 Leafly included CannaCruz in its list of the best California dispensaries to buy seeds and clones.

References

External links
 Official site

Companies based in Santa Cruz, California
2008 establishments in California
Cannabis in California
Cannabis dispensaries in the United States